Henderson County is the name of several counties in the United States:

Henderson County, Illinois 
Henderson County, Kentucky 
Henderson County, North Carolina 
Henderson County, Tennessee 
Henderson County, Texas